I Ngurah Komang Arya (born October 14, 1985 in Bali) is an Indonesian footballer who plays for Martapura in the Liga 2.

References

1985 births
Living people
Balinese people
Indonesian footballers
Liga 1 (Indonesia) players
Arema F.C. players
PSM Makassar players
Persiba Balikpapan players
Bali United F.C. players
Balinese sportspeople
Association football goalkeepers
Sportspeople from Bali